

This article lists persons and politicians who have been appointed as the Minister of Religious Affairs in Indonesia.
Political Party:
Islamic Organization:

Deputy ministers

Following are politicians who have been appointed as the Deputy Minister of Religious Affairs in Indonesia.
Political Party:
Islamic Organization:

Notes

Bibliography

References

See also 
 Cabinet of Indonesia
 Ministry of Religious Affairs

Government ministers of Indonesia